Ouilly is an element in several place-names in Calvados, Lower Normandy, France:

 Ouilly-le-Vicomte
 Ouilly-le-Tesson
 Ouilly-du-Houley
 Pont-d'Ouilly

d'Ouilly is the origin of the English surnames d'Oyly and Doiley:

 The D'Oyly baronets, a number of British baronetcies.
 Richard D'Oyly Carte, Victorian theatrical impresario

This surname is further given to:

 D'Oyly Carte Island, an island in the River Thames, England.
 The doily, an ornamental table mat supposedly invented by a Mr Doiley